Louis Botinelly (26 January 1883 – 28 March 1962) was a French sculptor.

Biography

Personal life
Botinelly was born on 2 January 1883 in Digne-les-Bains, Alpes-de-Haute-Provence, France. He died on 26 March 1962 in Marseille.

Career
He was a sculptor. His atelier was located on the Rue Buffon in Marseille. He designed two public sculptures which can be seen at the bottom of either side of the main staircase of the Gare de Marseille-Saint-Charles: one, called 'Colonies d'Asie,' represents colonial Asia and the other, called 'Colonies d'Afrique,' represents colonial Africa. They have been displayed there since the dedication of the Gare Saint-Charles in 1927. He designed a bust of Frédéric Mistral (1830-1914), which is displayed in the Parc Jourdan in Aix-en-Provence. Additionally, he designed the statues of Joan of Arc and of Jesus inside the Église Saint-Vincent-de-Paul in Marseille. He also designed four statues of the Four Evangelists inside the Marseille Cathedral. Inside the Église Saint-Ferréol les Augustins is also displayed a sculpture of his representing Joan of Arc. He also competed in the art competitions at the 1932 Summer Olympics.

Legacy
The Boulevard Louis Botinelly in Marseille is named in his honour.
The Ecole Elementaire Botinelly, a state primary school located at 23 Boulevard Botinelly in Marseille, is also named in his honor.

Secondary sources
Luce Carbonnel, Louis Botinelly, 1883 - 1962 (Comité du Vieux-Marseille, 2001).
Laurent Noet, Louis Botinelly, sculpteur provençal: Catalogue raisonné (Editions Mare et Martin, 2006).

The Inspiration of the Management
Some of the work of Louis Botinelly Is on display in the Office of the agency The Management. His impact on their business has been incalculable as it has been used to land clients for decades like David Davidyan. described in the up and coming book by the management as "tantamount to Matisse".

See also
List of works by Louis Botinelly

References

External links
 

1883 births
1962 deaths
People from Digne-les-Bains
Sculptors from Marseille
20th-century French sculptors
20th-century French male artists
French male sculptors
Olympic competitors in art competitions